Science Magazine was a half-hour television show produced by CBC Television from 1975 to 1979.

The show was hosted by geneticist David Suzuki, who had previously hosted the daytime youth programme Suzuki On Science. Science Magazine moved beyond the youth audience and was mostly broadcast during prime time, except for occasional sessions where the show was repeated in the afternoon.

The program featured news and features on scientific research and developments. Regular items within the show included "How Things Work" and "Science Update". Jan Tennant and Cy Strange of the CBC were the program's film feature narrators.

Science Magazine, as such, ended production when the CBC joined it with The Nature of Things, using the latter as the title and Suzuki as host.

External links
 Queen's University Directory of CBC Television Series (Science Magazine archived listing link via archive.org)

1975 Canadian television series debuts
1979 Canadian television series endings
CBC Television original programming